Juarez is a station on both lines 1 and 2 of the Guadalajara light rail system in the Guadalajara Metropolitan Area, Mexico. It is located at the intersection of Del Federalismo Sur with Avenida Benito Juarez.

The Art Gallery of SITEUR (Sistema de Tren Eléctrico Urbano) is located here, exhibiting works by international artists. The station also hosts various cultural events, such as the book fair, lectures on the history of the neighborhoods of Guadalajara, storytelling, puppet shows, and plays for children, among other activities.

Points of interest
 Parque de la Revolución
 Rectory of the University of Guadalajara
 Templo Expiatorio del Santísimo Sacramento

References

Guadalajara light rail system Line 1 stations
Guadalajara light rail system Line 2 stations
Railway stations opened in 1989
1976 establishments in Mexico
Railway stations located underground in Mexico
Railway stations in Guadalajara
Railway stations opened in 1994